Dallas is a suburb in Melbourne, Victoria, Australia,  north of Melbourne's Central Business District, located within the City of Hume local government area. Dallas recorded a population of 6,762 at the 2021 census.

Dallas is bounded by Barry Road in the north, the Upfield railway line in the east, Geach Street, Terang Street, Tempy Court, Dallas Drive and Riggall Street in the south, and the Craigieburn/North East railway line in the west.

History

Dallas was named after the Governor of Victoria, General Sir Reginald Dallas Brooks. The Housing Commission of Victoria built many of the houses in the Dallas area between 1961 and 1970. The Dallas Primary School was built in 1963. Dallas North Primary opened in 1965. Dallas Post Office opened on 21 February 1966, but from 1968 to 1995 was known as Broadmeadows before reverting to Dallas.

Prior to the construction of the suburb, the Dallas area was primarily used for agriculture. In 1924, the Melbourne and Metropolitan Board of Works built a reservoir for reticulating water for the Broadmeadows area.

Population

At the 2016 census, Dallas had a population of 6,810. The most common ancestries were Turkish 20.0%, Australian 10.0%, Lebanese 9.1%, English 8.1% and Iraqi 2.8%. 43.5% of people were born in Australia. The next most common countries of birth were Turkey 11.3%, Iraq 5.9%, Lebanon 4.0%, Pakistan 2.5% and India 1.8%. 22.8% of people spoke only English at home. Other languages spoken at home included Turkish 23.1%, Arabic 17.4%, Assyrian Neo-Aramaic 3.1%, Urdu 3.0% and Vietnamese 2.3%. The most common responses for religion were Islam 49.3% and Catholic 15.6%.

Dallas has one of the highest concentrations of Muslims in Australia, at 49% of the population. The Broadmeadows Mosque is located on King Street.

Education
 Hume Central Secondary College
 Holy Child Catholic Primary School
 Dallas Brooks Community Primary School
 Ilim College Girls and Primary
 Ilim College Boys
 Hume Valley School Narrun Campus

Transport

Bus
Two bus routes service Dallas:
 : Craigieburn station – Broadmeadows station via Upfield station. Operated by Broadmeadows Bus Service.
 : Upfield station – Broadmeadows station via Coolaroo. Operated by Dysons.

Train
The nearest railway stations to Dallas are Coolaroo and Broadmeadows stations, both on the Craigieburn line, and Upfield station, on the Upfield line.

Food and nightlife

There are a number of takeaway stores in the Dallas Shopping Strip. There are many kebab stores as well as Indian, charcoal chicken and fish and chips.

There is also the Coolaroo Hotel on Barry Road, which has a drive through bottle shop and is open until late.

See also
City of Broadmeadows – Dallas was previously within this former local government area.

References

External links
Australian Places – Dallas

Suburbs of Melbourne
Suburbs of the City of Hume